The 2021 Louisiana's 5th congressional district special election was held on March 20, 2021. It was triggered by the death of Republican congressman-elect Luke Letlow on December 29, 2020, who died from a heart attack while being treated for COVID-19.

When congressional seats in Louisiana become vacant, the Governor may call a special election at any time. The special election to fill Louisiana's 5th congressional district took place on March 20, 2021, as stated by Governor John Bel Edwards's office. Luke Letlow's widow, Julia Letlow, won the election with more than 64 percent of the vote.

Background

Congressional district

Louisiana's 5th congressional district includes all or part of Avoyelles, Caldwell, Catahoula, Concordia, East Carroll, East Feliciana, Franklin, Jackson, La Salle Lincoln, Madison, Morehouse, Rapides, Richland, St. Helena, St. Landry, Tangipahoa, Tensas, Washington, West Carroll, West Feliciana, and Winn parishes. Traditionally conservative, the district has been considered a safe seat for Republicans since Rodney Alexander changed his party affiliation in 2004. Although the Democratic Party had an enrollment advantage of 26,719 at the time of the 2020 presidential election, Donald Trump won over 64 percent of the district's vote.

2020 election and Letlow's death

In February 2020, Ralph Abraham, who had been serving as the district's U.S. Representative since 2015, announced that he would not run for re-election. Abraham's former chief of staff, Luke Letlow, announced his candidacy in the congressional election shortly thereafter, with Abraham publicly endorsing him. Letlow was an outspoken supporter of President Donald Trump, and he publicly praised his leadership during the COVID-19 pandemic.

In the jungle primary on November 3, Letlow won the most votes, but he was unable to secure a majority, triggering a runoff election against runner-up Lance Harris. Letlow defeated Harris in the runoff election on December 5, with 62 percent of the vote. Shortly after his victory in the runoff, Letlow tested positive for COVID-19, and he was hospitalized the following day. Letlow's condition worsened, and he was moved to the intensive care unit where he died days later on December 29, less than a week before he was scheduled to be sworn into office.

Candidates

Democratic Party

Declared
Sandra "Candy" Christophe, social worker and candidate for this seat in 2020

Withdrawn
 Jessica Honsinger Hollister, actress

Republican Party

Declared
Chad Conerly, finance professional
Allen Guillory, candidate for this seat in 2020
Robert Lansden, attorney
Julia Letlow, administrative executive assistant at University of Louisiana at Monroe and widow of U.S. representative-elect Luke Letlow
Jaycee Magnuson
Horace Melton III
Richard H. Pannell
Sancha Smith, political organizer
Errol Victor Sr., pastor

Declined
 Ralph Abraham, former U.S. Representative and candidate for Governor of Louisiana in 2019
 Stewart Cathey, state senator (endorsed Julia Letlow)
 Michael Echols, state representative
 Lance Harris, state representative and candidate for this seat in 2020
 Mike Johnson, state representative
 Scotty Robinson, Ouachita Parish Police Juror and candidate for this seat in 2020

No party affiliation

Declared
Jim Davis
M. V. "Vinny" Mendoza, perennial candidate

Endorsements

Jungle primary

Predictions

Results

By parish

See also
List of special elections to the United States House of Representatives

References

External links 
Official campaign websites
 Sandra "Candy" Christophe (D) for Congress 
 Chad Conerly (R) for Congress 
 Robert Lansden (R) for Congress
 Julia Letlow (R) for Congress
 Jaycee Magnuson (R) for Congress
 M. V. "Vinny" Mendoza (I) for Congress
 Sancha Smith (R) for Congress
 Errol Victor Sr. (R) for Congress 

Louisiana 2021 05
Louisiana 2021 05
2021 05 Special
Louisiana 05 Special
United States House of Representatives 05 Special
United States House of Representatives 2021 05
March 2021 events in the United States